Inediibacterium is a Gram-positive, spore-forming, and strictly anaerobic bacterial genus from the family of Clostridiaceae with one known species (Inediibacterium massiliense). It was isolated from the gut flora of an undernourished infant.

References

Clostridiaceae
Bacteria genera
Monotypic bacteria genera
Taxa described in 2017